Abelé is a Champagne producer based in the Reims region of Champagne. The house was founded in 1757 by Téodore Vander-Veken as the third Champagne house in history.

The house produces approximately 400,000 bottles annually.

See also
 List of Champagne houses

References

External links
 

Champagne producers
1757 establishments in France
French companies established in 1757